Roberto Brum Vallado (born 7 July 1978), known as Brum, is a Brazilian retired footballer who played as a defensive midfielder.

Football career
Born in São Gonçalo, Rio de Janeiro, Brum started his professional career in Brazil with Fluminense FC and Coritiba Foot Ball Club. He helped the latter team win the 2003 and 2004 Paraná State championships.

Moving to Portugal, Brum joined Académica de Coimbra for 2004–05. He was an undisputed starter in his two final Primeira Liga seasons, earning him a transfer to perennial UEFA Cup qualification candidates S.C. Braga in the 2007–08 campaign.

After helping the Minho side again reach the UEFA Cup, Brum returned to Brazil, signing with Santos FC. On 16 September 2009, he joined Figueirense Futebol Clube on loan.

In January 2011, aged nearly 33, Brum moved abroad again, signing with Alki Larnaca FC in Cyprus. He retired the following year after a brief spell with amateurs São Gonçalo Esporte Clube in his hometown, and started his managerial career precisely with that club.

Personal life
Brum was known for his humorous and unusual replies during interviews, where he also resorted to religious connotations. After retiring, he worked as a minister.

References

External links

Conteúdo Esportivo profile 

1978 births
Living people
People from São Gonçalo, Rio de Janeiro
Brazilian footballers
Association football midfielders
Campeonato Brasileiro Série A players
Campeonato Brasileiro Série B players
Fluminense FC players
Coritiba Foot Ball Club players
Santos FC players
Figueirense FC players
Primeira Liga players
Associação Académica de Coimbra – O.A.F. players
S.C. Braga players
Cypriot First Division players
Alki Larnaca FC players
Brazilian expatriate footballers
Expatriate footballers in Portugal
Expatriate footballers in Cyprus
Brazilian expatriate sportspeople in Portugal
Brazilian expatriate sportspeople in Cyprus
Sportspeople from Rio de Janeiro (state)